The Young Lovers is an outdoor sculpture by Georg Ehrlich, installed at Festival Gardens in London, United Kingdom. It was installed in the garden in 1973.

See also
 List of public art in the City of London

References

External links
 
 The Young Lovers – Festival Gardens, Cannon Street, London, UK at Waymarking

1973 establishments in England
City of London
Outdoor sculptures in London
Sculptures of men in the United Kingdom
Sculptures of women in the United Kingdom